Gospel of the Twelve Apostles may refer to:
 Gospel of the Twelve, lost gospel
 Gospel of the Twelve Apostles, Syriac gospel